The Royal Institution of Naval Architects (also known as RINA) is an international organisation representing naval architects.  It is an elite international professional institution based in London. Its members are involved worldwide at all levels in the design, construction, repair and operation of ships, boats and marine structures. Members are elected by the council and are presented with the titles AssocRINA (Associate), AMRINA (Associate Member), MRINA (Member) and FRINA (Fellow) depending on their membership type. These title are usually suffixed after the name of the member.

The Patron of the Institution is Queen Elizabeth II.

History

The Royal Institution of Naval Architects was founded in Britain in 1860 as The Institution of Naval Architects and incorporated by Royal Charter in 1910 and 1960 to "advance the art and science of ship design".

Founding members included John Scott Russell, Edward Reed, Rev Joseph Woolley, Nathaniel Barnaby, Frederick Kynaston Barnes and John Penn.

On 9 April 1919 Blanche Thornycroft, Rachel Mary Parsons, and Eily Keary became the first women admitted into the institution.

Present role

The Royal Institution of Naval Architects is an international organisation with its headquarters in the UK, representing naval architects in all the maritime nations of the world. It is a professional institution and learned society of international standing, whose members are involved worldwide at all levels in the design, construction, repair and maintenance of ships, boats and maritime structures. Through its international membership, publications and conferences, the Royal Institution of Naval Architects provides a link between industry, universities and maritime organisations worldwide.

Professional institution
As a professional institution, its aim is to set standards of professional competence and conduct, and assist its members to both achieve and maintain those standards.  Membership of the Royal Institution of Naval Architects provides a professional qualification which is internationally recognised as demonstrating the achievement of the highest standards of professional competence and integrity.

Learned society
As a learned society, the Royal Institution of Naval Architects provides a forum for the exchange of information, views and discussion.  Access to up-to-date technical information is essential to the professional development of naval architects, and the Royal Institution of Naval Architects provides this primarily through its range of technical journals, books and papers, and an extensive programme of international conferences and training courses covering all aspects of naval architecture and maritime technology.

Arms

See also
 Royal Society of Arts

References

External links 
 The Royal Institution of Naval Architects

Organizations established in 1860
1860 establishments in the United Kingdom
ECUK Licensed Members
Marine engineering organizations